Maja Neuenschwander (born 13 February 1980 in Bern, Canton of Bern) is a Swiss long-distance runner who competes in marathon races. Her personal best for the marathon distance is 2:30:09 hours – run at the 2015 Vienna Marathon where she was the first female runner overall (the first Swiss victory in history).

She has represented her country in the marathon at the European Athletics Championships (2010) and the Summer Olympics (2012).

Career
Her first international outing came at the European Cross Country Championships, where she ran in the junior race and placed 16th in 1998 and 30th in 1999. She was a 5000 metres finalist at the 1999 European Athletics Junior Championships, finishing seventh.

She made her half marathon debut in Uster in 2000 and came fifth with a time of 76:26 minutes. Despite this early start, she did not compete in top level athletics for several years after this. She returned to action in 2006 with a new focus on the marathon distance. She ran a best of 2:44:24 hours for third at the Zurich Marathon and came 13th at the Berlin Marathon. She had similar results the following year, placing fourth in Zurich and 15th in Berlin. In 2008, she ran under two hours and forty minutes for the first time at the Berlin Marathon, crossing the line after 2:38:53 hours to take twelfth place. She had marked improvement in 2009, setting personal bests of 76:22 minutes at the Paris Half Marathon and 2:35:44 at the 2009 Berlin Marathon.

These performances brought Neuenschwander her first senior international appearances: she came 25th in the marathon at the 2010 European Athletics Championships and she competed at the 2012 Summer Olympics in the marathon where she finished in 53rd place. In the meantime she had brought her best down to 2:33:45 at the 2011 Berlin Marathon then 2:31:56 to take the runner-up spot at the Zurich Marathon.

The start of the 2013 brought Neuenschwander a personal best of 2:30:50 with which she was the runner-up at the Hamburg Marathon.

Personal bests
10,000 metres: 35:49.89 min (1999)
Half-marathon: 1:11:08 hours (2015)
Marathon: 2:26:49 hours (2015)

Results

References

External links

1980 births
Living people
Swiss female long-distance runners
Swiss female marathon runners
Olympic athletes of Switzerland
Athletes (track and field) at the 2012 Summer Olympics
Athletes (track and field) at the 2016 Summer Olympics
Sportspeople from Bern